Whim is a settlement on the island of Saint Croix in the United States Virgin Islands.

It is located east of Frederiksted off Centerline Road.

History
The town is located at the site of Estate Whim, a large sugarcane plantation, sugar mill, and rum distillery during the colonial Danish West Indies era. The Whin estate was in the 18th century owned first by Christopher MacEvoy Sr. and later by his son Christopher MacEvoy Sr. The stone ruins are on the National Register of Historic Places.

See also
 Sugar production in the Danish West Indies
 Sugar plantations in the Caribbean
 National Register of Historic Places listings in the United States Virgin Islands

References

Populated places in Saint Croix, U.S. Virgin Islands
National Register of Historic Places in the United States Virgin Islands